Linda Gerard (December 24, 1938 - March 21, 2014) was a singer, stage actress and cabaret artist based in Palm Springs, California. Originally from Trenton, New Jersey, she had performed on and off Broadway in theater productions, cabaret acts and as a singer across the Eastern seaboard and later in California. Gerard was a self-identified OWL—an older, wiser lesbian.

Early career

Gerard was understudy for Barbra Streisand and Mimi Hines in the original 1960s runs of the musical Funny Girl, taking the stage as Fanny Brice many times. In the sixties and seventies, she developed an original repertoire of comedy and song which she performed at a variety of venues on the East coast.

Seventies

In 1975, she moved from New York City to Provincetown, Massachusetts, where she became the "most talked about cabaret singer in Ptown." She performed at and became co-owner of the Pied Piper. According to the book Ptown: Art, Sex, and Money on the Outer Cape, "During the 1970s, Provincetown's Pied Piper was the foremost lesbian bar on the eastern seaboard, if not in the whole United States. During the summer season, lines snaked around the block, women bouncers guarded the entrance, and inside, women who had come from such faraway places as Montreal and Kansas City flirted, drank, danced." Gerard became co-owner of the Pied Piper when she helped to rebuild the bar after it burnt down on New Year's Eve of 1978. She and her business partner sold the bar in 1987.

Later Years

Linda Gerard moved to California, where she opened The Rose Tattoo in 1988, which she envisioned as "a real New York cabaret" in West Hollywood. She performed at The Rose Tattoo through much of the nineties.

In 2008, Gerard was a contestant on the game show Deal or No Deal and won $165,000.

Linda Gerard hosted Sissy Bingo, a Monday bingo night and cabaret performance at King's Highway, a diner at Ace Hotel & Swim Club in Palm Springs. In 2012, Ace Hotel released Linda Gerard: Fabulous Selections, a compilation record of some of Gerard's earlier recorded material including show tunes, jazz standards, sixties-era novelty songs like "See the Cheetah" and the empowerment anthem "A Woman Starting Out All Over Again."

Death

In February 2013, Gerard was diagnosed with Stage 4 lung cancer.  She continued to perform and make public appearances until shortly before her death on March 21, 2014.

References

Sources
 Linda Gerard on Ace Hotel blog
 Linda Gerard interview in Palm Springs Life
 Linda Gerard cabaret review in The New York Times
 Linda Gerard and The Pied Piper in Ptown: Art, Sex, and Money on the Outer Cape

1938 births
2014 deaths
American cabaret performers
Actresses from New Jersey
Actresses from California
American women singers
American stage actresses
Actors from Trenton, New Jersey
Actresses from Palm Springs, California
Contestants on American game shows
Musicians from Trenton, New Jersey
American lesbian actresses
21st-century American women